Valdivienne is a commune in the Vienne department in the Nouvelle-Aquitaine region in western France.
Its name is a contraction of "Vallée de la Dive et de la Vienne" (the Dive and Vienne valley).

Population

See also
Communes of the Vienne department

References

Communes of Vienne